Isla Grant is a Scottish singer and songwriter. Born in Wigtownshire, Scotland, Grant grew up in a musical family and was greatly influenced by the folk music of her region. She learned to play the guitar and took an interest in American country music. Grant started her own record label I.G.E. and released her first album on her own label in October 2008.

Discography

Albums

References

Living people
Year of birth missing (living people)
Scottish singer-songwriters
21st-century Scottish singers
People from Wigtown